Shooting Times and Country Magazine, more commonly known as the Shooting Times, is a British shooting, fieldsports, and conservation magazine, published by Future plc. The magazine also features articles on fishing, deer stalking, gamekeeping, gundogs, cookery, and conservation.

History
Wildfowler's Shooting Times and Kennel News, the publication's original title, was first published in September 1882 and has not missed a single edition since. Lewis Clement was the first editor.  
  
Throughout its history, Shooting Times has offered a forum for debate in the shooting world—famously in the 26 October 1907 issue, Stanley Duncan, (a long-term contributor to the magazine) wrote in with a request: "Sir, I have been asked to suggest a Wildfowlers's Association, to which you, Mr Editor, might give some assistance by permitting your paper to be the organ through which proposals might be considered and views obtained?"

The name of the association born out of the ensuing correspondence was the Wildfowlers' Association of Great Britain and Ireland—now known as the British Association for Shooting and Conservation (BASC) and one of the principal shooting organisations in the country.

Over the years Shooting Times has carried articles by writers and such sportsmen as Denys Watkins-Pitchford ("BB"), Colin Willock, Arthur Oglesby, Gough Thomas,  gun expert Geoffrey Boothroyd and Major Archie Coats, the grandfather of modern pigeon shooting.

Modern day
Shooting Times magazine is the official journal of both the BASC and the Clay Pigeon Shooting Association (CPSA).

The magazine has had 18 editors, the current being the journalist and author, Patrick Galbraith. . Shooting Times, in recent years, has had a renewed focus on good writing, with Galbraith bringing on columnists such as Jamie Blackett and Patrick Laurie. It has also become more focussed on conservation with writers and commentators such as Richard Negus appearing regularly. The magazine is published weekly and is considered to be the leading shooting publication in Britain.

References

External links 

Magazines established in 1882
English-language magazines
Sports magazines published in the United Kingdom
Hunting and fishing magazines
Hunting and shooting in the United Kingdom
1882 establishments in the United Kingdom
Weekly magazines published in the United Kingdom
Firearms magazines